James Rankin Young (March 10, 1847 – December 18, 1924) was a Republican member of the U.S. House of Representatives from Pennsylvania. He was the younger brother of fellow journalist John Russell Young.

Early life
James R. Young was born in Philadelphia, Pennsylvania.  He enlisted in the Union Army in June 1863 in the Thirty-second Regiment, Pennsylvania Volunteer Infantry.  He was one of the founders of the Philadelphia Evening Star in 1866.  He attended all of the Republican National Conventions from 1864 through 1908.  He served as chief of the Washington bureau of the New York Tribune from June 1866 to December 1870.  He was chief executive clerk of the United States Senate from December 1873 to March 1879 and again from December 1883 to April 1892.  In between he was Chief Clerk of the Department of Justice from September 1882 to December 1883.

United States House of Representatives

He was elected in 1896 as a Republican to the 55th United States Congress.   He was the Chairman of the United States House Committee on Expenditures in the War Department in the 57th United States Congress.  He became superintendent of the Dead Letter Office of the Post Office Department from 1905 to 1913, and superintendent of the postal savings depository in Philadelphia until 1915.  He was a resident of Washington, D.C., until his death. He was interred at Glenwood Cemetery in Washington, D.C.

References

 Retrieved on 2008-02-14
The Political Graveyard

1847 births
1924 deaths
American newspaper founders
New-York Tribune personnel
People of Pennsylvania in the American Civil War
Politicians from Philadelphia
Republican Party members of the United States House of Representatives from Pennsylvania
Union Army soldiers
Burials at Glenwood Cemetery (Washington, D.C.)